The Pyralinae are the typical subfamily of snout moths (family Pyralidae) and occur essentially worldwide, in some cases aided by involuntary introduction by humans. They are rather rare in the Americas however, and their diversity in the Australian region is also limited. Altogether, this subfamily includes about 900 described species, but new ones continue to be discovered. Like many of their relatives in the superfamily Pyraloidea, the caterpillar larvae of many Pyralinae – and in some cases even the adults – have evolved the ability to use unusual foods for nutrition; a few of these can become harmful to humans as pests of stored goods.

Description and ecology

This subfamily unites generally mid-sized to smallish moths with a more or less cryptic coloration including most often various hues of brownish colors. Adult females of Pyralinae (except Cardamyla and Embryoglossa) are characterized by the short genital ductus bursae, their corpus bursae barely extending forward beyond abdominal segment 7. Otherwise they are rather nondescript mid-sized moths (large by Pyralidae standards) which at least sometimes can be distinguished from their relatives by possessing forewing vein 7 and having hindwing veins 7 and 8 unjoined as adults.

The meal moth (Pyralis farinalis) and the grease moth (Aglossa pinguinalis) are pests of stored food products, in the case of the grease moth including fats (which are also eaten by the adult moths), and have been inadvertently spread almost worldwide by transport of such goods. Most other species' caterpillars are leaf feeders; the extremely polyphagous larvae of Pyralis manihotalis have been reared from bat guano.

Systematics
The systematics and taxonomy of this subfamily is somewhat provisional. No quantitative phylogenetic analysis had been done as of 2007, though in the mid-late 1990s Michael Shaffer of the London Natural History Museum and Maria Alma Solis of the NMNH prepared the groundwork for further studies by their comprehensive qualitative reviews of Pyralinae morphology. Some cladistic studies of the Pyraloidea do exist however, and these place the Pyralinae among the advanced snout moths, a lineage which otherwise includes the even more autapomorphic subfamilies Epipaschiinae and Phycitinae.

Even though the Pyralinae contain a high number of genera and species, there are a mere three tribes generally accepted nowadays; others that were proposed earlier (in some cases even as independent subfamilies within Pyralidae) are presently treated as junior synonyms of the Pyralini. A large number of genera are considered not to be reliably assignable to one of the three tribes; it is not at all certain that the presently-used subdivisions of the Pyralinae are the last word on the issue.

The tribes – with some significant genera and species also noted – and the genera of unclear affiliation in this subfamily are:

Endotrichini Ragonot, 1890 (= Endotrichinae)
 Endotricha Zeller, 1847
 Endotricha flammealis
 Endotricha ignealis
 Endotricha pyrosalis
 Persicoptera Meyrick, 1884
 Persicoptera compsopa

Hypotiini Chapman, 1902 (= Hypotiinae)
 Hypotia Zeller, 1847

Pyralini
 Almost 40 genera

Genera incertae sedis

 Acteniopsis Amsel, 1959
 Adulis Ragonot, 1891
 Aglossodes Ragonot, 1891
 Antisindris Marion, 1955
 Arctioblepsis C. & R.Felder, 1862
 Benderia Amsel, 1949
 Betsimisaraka Marion, 1955
 Burgeonidea Ghesquière, 1942
 Celetostola Meyrick, 1936
 Comaria Ragonot, 1892
 Cosmethella Munroe & Shaffer, 1980
 Delopterus Janse, 1922
 Diboma Walker, 1863
 Diloxia Hampson, 1896
 Discordia Swinhoe, 1885
 Elaealis Hampson, 1906
 Embryoglossa Warren, 1896
 Epacternis Meyrick, 1933
 Ethelontides Meyrick, 1934
 Euryzonella Ghesquière, 1942
 Eutrichodes Warren, 1891
 Grammiphlebia Hampson, 1906
 Gvelilia Strand, 1920
 Haplosindris Viette, 1953
 Heterocrasa Warren, 1896
 Hirayamaia Marumo, 1917
 Hyboloma Ragonot, 1891
 Hypanchyla Warren, 1891
 Hypsidia Rothschild, 1896
 Imerina Ragonot, 1891
 Lamacha Walker, 1863
 Larice Ragonot, 1892
 Latagognoma Tams, 1935
 Lophocera Kenrick, 1917
 Lorymav Walker, 1859 (Pyralini?)
 Lorymana Strand, 1915
 Lorymodes Hampson, 1917
 Macropyralis Amsel, 1953
 Marionana Viette, 1953
 Maschalandra Meyrick, 1937
 Meca Karsch, 1900
 Megalomia Ragonot, 1891
 Melanalis Hampson, 1906
 Mesosindris Viette, 1967
 Methora Walker, 1866
 Micromystix de Joannis, 1929
 Mimicia Caradja, 1925
 Minooa Yamanaka, 1996
 Mittonia Whalley, 1964
 Namibina Leraut, 2007
 Namibiodes Leraut, 2007
 Neobostra Hampson, 1906
 Nhoabe Viette, 1953
 Nussia Leraut, 2009
 Ocydina Meyrick, 1936
 Omphalobasella Strand, 1915
 Omphalomia Swinhoe, 1894
 Orybina Snellen, 1895
 Parachmidia Hampson, 1896
 Paraglossa Hampson, 1906
 Paraphycita Hampson, 1901
 Perforadix Sein, 1930
 Perula Mabille, 1900
 Peucela Ragonot, 1891
 Phasga Walker, 1863
 Pithyllis Grünberg, 1910
 Poliostola Janse, 1922
 Polycampsis Warren, 1896
 Propachys Walker, 1863
 Proropera Warren, 1896
 Prosaris Meyrick, 1894
 Proteinia Hampson, 1896
 Pseudozitha Leraut, 2007
 Pyralosis Amsel, 1957
 Rhynchetera Hampson, 1896
 Rhynchopygia Hampson, 1896
 Rostripalpus Hampson, 1896
 Rungsina Leraut, 2004
 Sacada Walker, 1862
 Setomigma Ghesquière, 1942
 Scotomera Butler, 1881 (Pyralini?)
 Sindris Boisduval, 1833
 Sphalerosticha Warren, 1897
 Sybrida Walker, 1865
 Tegulifera Saalmüller, 1880 (Pyralini?)
 Toccolosida Walker, 1863
 Trihauchenia Warren, 1892
 Triphassa Hübner, 1818
 Tyndis Ragonot, 1891
 Vitessidia Rothschild & Jordan, 1905
 Xenomilia Warren, 1896
 Zitha Walker, [1866] (including Tamraca; Pyralini?)

The genus Micronix, formerly placed here, seems to belong to the Crambidae, but its exact placement is obscure. For a similar case, see Tanaobela.

Footnotes

References

  (1986): Pyralidae and Microlepidoptera of the Marquesas Archipelago. Smithsonian Contributions to Zoology 416: 1–485. PDF fulltext (214 MB!)
  (2011): Markku Savela's Lepidoptera and some other life forms: Pyralinae. Version of 2011-MAR-03. Retrieved 2011-MAY-29.
  (2007): Phylogenetic studies and modern classification of the Pyraloidea (Lepidoptera). Revista Colombiana de Entomología 33(1): 1-8 [English with Spanish abstract]. HTML fulltext

 
Moth subfamilies